was a brother of the famous Mōri Motonari and son of Mōri Hiromoto.

See also
Mōri clan
Mōri Motonari

1542 deaths